Diatenes is a genus of moths of the family Erebidae.

Species
 Diatenes aglossoides Guenée, 1852
 Diatenes chalybescens Guenée, 1852
 Diatenes gerula Guenée, 1852
 Diatenes igneipicta Lower, 1902

References

Calpinae
Noctuoidea genera